Joe Stapleton was an English professional footballer who played as a centre half for Uxbridge Town, Fulham and Cambridge City.

References

Year of birth missing (living people)
Living people
English footballers
Association football defenders
Fulham F.C. players
Cambridge City F.C. players
English Football League players
Place of birth missing (living people)